Athyma perius, the common sergeant, is a species of nymphalid butterfly found in South Asia and Southeast Asia.

Description
The Athyma perius male has black wings with a series of white markings, while the female is a blackish brown. The underside of the wings are ochre yellow with the white markings as on the upperside but heavily margined and defined with black. The antennae are black and there is a spot of ochre between the eyes. The thorax has a band or two of bluish spots anteriorly and posteriorly. The abdomen is transversely and narrowly barred with bluish white; beneath, the palpi, thorax and abdomen pure white. In the female, the abdomen has a double lateral row of minute black dots.

Subspecies
Listed alphabetically:
Athyma perius avitus (Fruhstorfer, 1915)
Athyma perius hierasus (Fruhstorfer, 1915)
Athyma perius perinus Fruhstorfer, 1903
Athyma perius perius (Linnaeus, 1758)

Distribution
Athyma perius is found throughout the Himalayas, India, Burma, Tenasserim, to Siam and the Malay Peninsula.

Life history
Athyma perius uses Glochidion lanceolatum, G. velutinum and Wendlandia thyrsoidea as food plants.

References

Athyma
Fauna of Pakistan
Butterflies of Asia
Butterflies of Indochina
Butterflies described in 1758
Taxa named by Carl Linnaeus